The Sound of Wilson Pickett is a studio album by Wilson Pickett, released in 1967.

Track listing

Personnel
Wilson Pickett – vocals
Spooner Oldham – keyboards, piano, organ
Chips Moman – lead guitar
Jimmy Johnson - rhythm guitar
Tommy Cogbill – bass guitar
Albert S. Lowe Jr. – bass guitar
Roger Hawkins – drums
Wayne Jackson – trumpet
Gene Miller – trumpet
Andrew Love – tenor saxophone
Charles Chalmers – tenor saxophone
James Mitchell - tenor saxophone
Floyd Newman – baritone saxophone
Technical
Rick Hall, Tom Dowd - recording engineer
Haig Adishian - cover design
Nick Samardge - cover photography

References

1967 albums
Wilson Pickett albums
Albums produced by Tom Dowd
Albums produced by Jerry Wexler
Atlantic Records albums